Atlantic Ferry (alternate U.S. title: Sons of the Sea) is a 1941 British film directed by Walter Forde and starring Michael Redgrave and Valerie Hobson. It was made at Teddington Studios.

Plot 
In 1837 Liverpool, brothers Charles and David MacIver have great faith in steam-powered ships. Their first attempt, the coastal freighter Gigantic, proves to be an embarrassing and costly failure, sinking immediately after being launched. David becomes discouraged and, to save their failing shipping firm, agrees to a merger proposed by longtime rival George Burns.

Charles, however, is undaunted, despite being turned down by every banker when he seeks new funding. He gives his share of the family firm to David and sets out on his own. He teams up with American Samuel Cunard and engineer Robert Napier, and they build the RMS Britannia. They win a British mail contract and make the first steamship crossing of the Atlantic, from Liverpool to Boston, in record time, despite a storm that threatens to sink the ship.

Romantic complications ensue when both brothers fall in love with Mary Ann Morison, the daughter of an important government shipping official. She agrees to marry David (before she becomes acquainted with his brother), but it is Charles who wins her heart.

Cast

Reception 
The film received neutral-to-negative reviews.

According to Warner Bros. records, it earned $87,000 domestically and $16,000 foreign.

References

External links 
 
 
 
 Film stills from Picture Show Annual

1941 films
1941 romantic drama films
1940s English-language films
British black-and-white films
British romantic drama films
Films directed by Walter Forde
Films scored by Jack Beaver
Films set in Liverpool
Films set in the 1830s
Films set in the Atlantic Ocean
Seafaring films
Warner Bros. films
1940s British films